BHEL Townships being located at various locations may refer to:

 BHEL Township, Bhopal

 BHEL Township, Hyderabad
 BHEL Jhansi, BHEL township
 Ramachandrapuram (BHEL Township)
 Ranipur, Uttarakhand, BHEL Township